Nothodaptus simplex is a species of beetle in the family Carabidae, the only species in the genus Nothodaptus.

References

Harpalinae